The Coalition of Urban Serving Universities (commonly referred to as USU) is a selective organization of 46 U.S. universities and 1 university medical center located in metropolitan areas. The USU member schools began formally meeting in 2005.

Governance

The USU Board of Directors is composed of Presidents and Chancellors of 10 member institutions. USU is headquartered in Washington, D.C.

The coalition has four specific areas of focus with the goal of strengthening communities throughout the nation via health and community-involvement initiatives:
The Education Pipeline/Urban Educator Corps - to improve the quality and quantity of urban teachers and implement evidence-based “cradle-to-career” education partnerships.
The Urban Health Initiative - to increase the number, diversity, and competence of the health workforce and reduce health disparities in urban communities.
The Strengthening Communities Initiative - to revitalize neighborhoods, build community capacity, and strengthen regional economies.
Student Performance - Fostering Student Achievement to identify, assess with appropriate metrics, and disseminate substantive, scalable best practices along the continuum of efforts that support student success and degree completion.

Membership

Arizona State University - 
Boise State University - 
California State University, East Bay - 
California State University, Fullerton - 
California State University, Long Beach - 
California State University, Northridge - 
Cleveland State University - 
Florida International University - 
Fresno State University - 
Georgia State University - 
Morgan State University - 
Ohio State University - 
Portland State University - 
Indiana University Purdue University Indianapolis - 
San Francisco State University - 
San Jose State University - 
The State University of New York System - 
Stony Brook University - 
SUNY College of Environmental Science and Forestry - 
SUNY Downstate Medical Center - 
SUNY Upstate Medical University - 
Temple University - 
Texas Tech University - 
University at Albany, SUNY - 
University at Buffalo, SUNY - 
University of Akron - 
University of Central Florida - 
University of Cincinnati - 
University of Colorado Denver - 
University of Houston - 
University of Illinois at Chicago - 
University of Louisville - 
University of Massachusetts Boston - 
University of Memphis - 
University of Minnesota - 
University of Missouri-Kansas City - 
University of New Mexico - 
University of North Carolina at Charlotte - 
University of Washington, Tacoma - 
University of Wisconsin–Milwaukee - 
Virginia Commonwealth University - 
Wayne State University - 
Wichita State University - 

†=private

References

External links
 Coalition of Urban Serving Universities—Official web site
 Members of USU—Official list

College and university associations and consortia in the United States